Eclipidrilus is a genus of annelids belonging to the family Lumbriculidae.

The species of this genus are found in Europe and Northern America.

Species:

Eclipidrilus asymmetricus 
Eclipidrilus breviatriatus 
Eclipidrilus daneus 
Eclipidrilus fontanus 
Eclipidrilus frigidus 
Eclipidrilus ithys 
Eclipidrilus lacustris 
Eclipidrilus levanidovi 
Eclipidrilus macphersonae 
Eclipidrilus microthecus 
Eclipidrilus pacificus 
Eclipidrilus palustris

References

Annelids